Daniel Holcomb (November 13, 1845 - December 14, 1900) was a recipient of the Medal of Honor and soldier in the Union Army during the American Civil War. He fought as a private in Company A of the 41st Ohio Volunteer Infantry Regiment. He earned his medal in action at Brentwood Hills, Tennessee on December 16, 1864 for "Capture of Confederate guidon." The medal was presented on February 22, 1865. Holcomb is currently interred at Crown Hill Cemetery, Sedalia, Missouri.

References 

United States Army Medal of Honor recipients
People from Licking County, Ohio
People of Ohio in the American Civil War
1845 births
1900 deaths
American Civil War recipients of the Medal of Honor